We Are the Only Friends We Have is a studio album by the Boston-based rock band Piebald.

Track listing

References

2002 albums
Piebald (band) albums
Big Wheel Recreation albums
Albums produced by Paul Q. Kolderie